"Too Blind to See It" is a song by American singer Kym Sims, written and produced by Steve "Silk" Hurley. It was released in 1991 as the first single from the debut album of the same name (1992) and uses a sample of the Shep Pettibone Mix of the 1983, First Choice track, "Let No Man Put Asunder". The song peaked at number 38 on the US Billboard Hot 100, and number-one on the Billboard Hot Dance Club Play chart. Outside of the US, it peaked within the top 10 of the charts in Denmark, Finland, and the UK. Additionally, it reached the top 20 of the charts in Australia, Belgium (Flanders), Luxembourg and the Republic of Ireland. A music video was also produced to promote the single.

Background and release
First released by the independent I.D. label in America in August 1991, it was subsequently picked up by Atco Records, which released it in the UK. Sims was asked to demo the song more than a year before she went back into the studio to record the commercially released version. She told in a 1991 interview, "I guess they must have decided to give it to someone else, but they came back eventually."

Lyrics

The lyrics of the song is sung from the perspective of a woman, saying goodbye to her soon-to-be ex-boyfriend. She feel used, he has been doing her wrong and, as the refraing goes, she was "too blind to see it. Too blind to see what you were doing." She has been trying to hide and deny her feelings, but not this time.

Critical reception
Larry Flick from Billboard stated in his review, that producer/songwriter Steve "Silk" Hurley "once again reaffirms his position as Chicago's finest on this wriggling, R&B-inflected houser", noting that newcomer Sims "exudes the confidence and range of a seasoned pro, while remixer Maurice Joshua drops another of his deep underground workouts." Chris Heim from Chicago Tribune declared it as "a slick, upbeat little dance tune". In an retrospective review, Pop Rescue called the song "infectious", adding that "laden with those catchy italia-house pianos, and fast beats, her vocals cut through them perfectly as she sings about a love lost." Richard Riccio from St. Petersburg Times wrote, "Best of all is the perfect balance she walks between dance floor drama and overdone diva kitsch, especially on the incredible stomp anthem, "Too Blind to See It"."

Chart performance
In the UK, "Too Blind to See It" peaked at number five on the UK Singles Chart on January 5, 1992 – for the week ending date January 11, 1992 – during its sixth week on the chart. But it reached number-one on the UK Dance Singles Chart and was certified silver by the British Phonographic Industry and became a huge club hit. Due to the song's major success on the charts in the UK, Sims performed it on the British music chart TV show Top of the Pops twice.

Elsewhere in Europe, "Too Blind to See It" also peaked at number six in Finland, number eight in Denmark, number eleven in Luxembourg and number 14 in Belgium. On the Eurochart Hot 100, it reached number 22. Outside of Europe, the song topped the charts in Zimbabwe, peaked at number five on the Billboard Hot Dance Club Play chart in Sims' native US, and number sixteen in Australia.

Track listings
 7-inch, Germany
"Too Blind to See It" (Hurley's "No Rap" House Mix) – 3:59
"Too Blind to See It" (Hurley's House Mix) – 5:00

 12-inch single, US
"Too Blind to See It" (Original Mix) – 3:46
"Too Blind to See It" (Maurice's Super Dub Mix) – 7:06
"Too Blind to See It" (Hurley's House Mix) – 4:57
"Too Blind to See It" (Hurley's Dub Mix) – 6:42 

 12-inch single, UK
"Too Blind to See It" (Hurley's House Mix) – 5:00
"Too Blind to See It" (Slam Atlantis Mix) – 6:15
"Too Blind to See It" (Original Soul Mix) – 3:52
"Too Blind to See It" (Hurley's House Dub) – 6:26
"Too Blind to See It" (Slam Dub Mix) – 6:15 

 CD single, UK and Europe
"Too Blind to See It" (Hurley's "No Rap" House Mix) – 3:32
"Too Blind to See It" (Hurley's House Mix) – 5:04
"Too Blind to See It" (Original Soul Mix) – 3:53
"Too Blind to See It" (Hurley's House Dub) – 6:25

Charts

Release history

References

1991 songs
1991 debut singles
Atco Records singles
East West Records singles
Electro songs
Electronic songs
House music songs
Songs written by Steve "Silk" Hurley
Music Week number-one dance singles
Number-one singles in Zimbabwe